The Cameron graph is a strongly regular graph of parameters .

External links
  A.E. Brouwer's website: the Cameron graph

Individual graphs
Regular graphs
Strongly regular graphs